A vintage computer is an older computer system that is largely obsolete.

The personal computer has been around since approximately 1971. But in that time, numerous technological revolutions have left generations of obsolete computing equipment on the junk heap. Nevertheless, in that time, these otherwise useless computers have spawned a sub-culture of vintage computer collectors, who often spend large sums to acquire the rarest of these items, not only to display but restore to their fully functioning glory, including active software development and adaptation to modern uses. This often includes so-called hackers who add on, update and create hybrid composites from new and old computers for uses for which they were otherwise never intended.  Ethernet interfaces have been designed for many vintage 8-bit machines to allow limited connectivity to the Internet; where users can access user groups, bulletin boards, and databases of software.  Most of this hobby centers on those computers manufactured after 1960, though some collectors specialize in pre-1960 computers as well.

MITS Inc. 

Micro Instrumentation and Telemetry Systems (MITS) produced the Altair 8800 in 1975, which is widely regarded as starting the microcomputer revolution.

IMSAI 

IMSAI produced a machine similar to the Altair 8800. It was introduced in 1975, first as a kit, and later as an assembled system. The list price was $591 for a kit, and $931 assembled.

Processor Technology 
Processor Technology produced the Sol-20.  This was one of the first machines to have a case that included a keyboard; a design feature copied by many of later "home computers".

SWTPC 
Southwest Technical Products Corporation (SWTPC) produced the 8-bit SWTPC 6800 and later the 16-bit SWTPC 6809 kits that employed the Motorola 68xx series microprocessors.

Apple Inc. 
The earliest Apple Inc. personal computers, using the MOS Technology 6502 processors, are among some of the most collectible. They are relatively easy to maintain in an operational state thanks to Apple's use of readily available off-the-shelf parts.

Apple I (1976): The Apple-1 was Apple's first product and has brought some of the highest prices ever paid for a microcomputer at auction.
Apple II (1977): The Apple II series of computers are some of the easiest to adapt, thanks to the original expansion architecture designed for them. New peripheral cards are still being designed by an avid thriving community, thanks to the longevity of this platform, manufactured from 1977 through 1993. Numerous websites exist to support not only legacy users but new adopters who weren't even born when the Apple II was discontinued by Apple.
Macintosh (1984): The original Macintosh used a 32-bit Motorola 68000 processor running at 7.8336 MHz and came with 128 K of RAM. The list price was $2495.<p>Perhaps because of its friendly design and first commercially successful graphical user interface as well as its enduring Finder application that persists on the most current Macs, the Macintosh is one of the most collected and used vintage computers. With dozens of websites around the world, old Macintosh hardware and software are input into daily use. The Macintosh had a strong presence in many early computer labs, creating a nostalgia factor for former students who recall their first computing experiences.

RCA 

 The COSMAC ELF in 1976 was an inexpensive (about $100) single-board computer that was easily built by hobbyists. Many people who could not afford an Altair could afford an ELF, which was based on the RCA 1802 chip. Because the chips are still available from other sources, modern recreations of the ELF are fairly common and there are several fan websites.

IBM 
 The IBM 1130 (1965) was a desk-sized small computer. It was the often the first computer used by many college students, still has a following of interested users. Most of the remaining 1130 systems in 2023 are in museums, but an emulator is available for users who don't have access to a physical 1130.
 The 5100 also has an avid collector and fan base.
 The PC series (5150 PC, 5155 Portable PC, 5160 PC/XT, 5170 PC/AT) has become very popular in recent years, with the earliest models (PC) being considered the most collectible.

Acorn BBC & Archimedes 
 The Acorn BBC Micro was a very popular British computer in the 1980s with home and educational users and enjoyed near-universal usage in British schools into the mid-1990s.  It was possible to use 100K -inch disks, and it had many expansion ports.
 The Archimedes series the de facto successor to the BBC Micro has also enjoyed a following in recent years, thanks to its status as the first computer to be based around ARM's RISC microprocessor.

Tandy/Radio Shack 
 The Tandy/RadioShack Model 100 is still widely collected and used as one of the earliest examples of a truly portable computer.  Other Tandy offerings, such as the TRS-80 line, are also very popular, and early systems, like the Model I, in good condition can command premium prices on the vintage computer market.

Sinclair 
 The Sinclair ZX81 and ZX Spectrum series were the most popular British home computers of the early 1980s, with a wide choice of emulators available for both platforms.  The Spectrum in particular enjoys a cult following due to its popularity as a games platform, with new games titles still being developed even today.  Original "rubber key" Spectrums fetch the highest prices on the second-hand market, with the later Amstrad-built models attracting less of a following.  The earlier ZX81 is not as popular in original hardware form due to its monochrome display and limited abilities next to the Spectrum, but still unassembled ZX81 kits still appear on eBay occasionally.

MSX 
 Although nearly nonexistent in the United States, the MSX architecture has strong communities of fans and hobbyists worldwide, particularly in Japan (where the standard was conceived and developed), South Korea (the only country that had an MSX-based game console, Zemmix), Netherlands, Spain, Brazil, Argentina, Russia, Chile, the Middle East, and others. New hardware and software are being actively developed to this day as well.
 One of the latest fundamental (from hardware and software perspectives) revivals of the MSX is the GR8BIT.

Robotron 
 The Robotron Z1013 was an East German home computer produced by VEB Robotron. It had a U880 processor, 16 KB RAM, and a membrane keyboard.
 The KC 85 series of computers was a modular 8-bit computer system used in East German schools.

Commodore 

 The Commodore 64 was the most sold single model of computer in the world.
 The Commodore PET was the first computer made by Commodore, and is highly collectible.
 The VIC-20 is the friendly computer and the first computer for Elon Musk and Linus Torvalds (creator of Linux).

Xerox 

 The Xerox Alto, designed and manufactured by Xerox PARC and released in 1973, was the first personal computer equipped with a graphic user interface.  In 1979, Steve Jobs of Apple Inc. arranged for his engineers to visit Xerox in order to see the Alto.  The design concepts of the Alto soon appeared in the Apple Lisa and Macintosh systems.
 The Xerox Star, also known as the 8010/40, was made available in 1981.  It followed on the Alto.  Like the Alto, this machine was expensive and was only intended for corporate office usage.  Therefore, being out of the price range of the average user, this product had little market penetration.

Silicon Graphics 

 The SGI Indy, built in 1993 for Silicon Graphics has a history of usage in the development of the Nintendo 64 as well as various CGI projects throughout the 1990s and early 2000s. The Indy and other machines in the SGI lineup have remained cult classics.

See also
 Retrocomputing
 History of computing hardware
 List of home computers by video hardware
 Living Computers: Museum + Labs
 Vintage Computer Festival

References

 Computer hardware
 
History of computing
Nostalgia